Jason Barber (born 1966) is an English farmer. Owning a farm in Beaminster, Dorset, he is the creator of Black Cow Vodka, which is cited as the "world's first milk vodka".

Career
Jason Barber was born in 1966, operates a dairy farm in Beaminster, Dorset; the farm was previously run by Barber's father, who gave the job to him in 2000. Barber would be the 6th generation of farmers in his family, dating back to the start of the 19th century. 
Barber is married to Sally. They have two sons.

Black Cow Vodka
Black Cow Vodka was created by Jason Barber and Paul Archard, through a trial and error process that took approximately five years. Barber had been inspired by the drink Araka, an alcoholic form of fermented mare's milk used by Genghis Khan and his armies. Araka, which is still made today, is approximately 7% ABV and more akin to a beer. 

The vodka is made using whey, as it is high in lactose and sugars to convert to alcohol with a specific yeast that will react with lactose. The product is triple filtered, including through a carbon made from coconut husk. After distillation, the product comes out at 48% ABV, at which point they process the liquid into Black Cow Vodka. The final concentration of the product is 40% ABV. In total,  of milk are required to make  of vodka.

The curds from the same milk are used to make 1833 cheddar and Black Cow Deluxe Cheddar, two other products from the same dairy farm, meaning that there is very little waste between the two processes. In 2016, the company produced 120,000 bottles of the vodka.

References

1966 births
21st-century British farmers
Living people